Ceritoturris is a genus of sea snails, marine gastropod mollusks in the family Horaiclavidae.

It was previously included within the subfamily Crassispirinae, family Turridae.

Fossils of Ceritoturris fecunda Lozouet, 1999 have been found in Miocene strata of Germany; age range: 15.97 to 11.608 Ma. and late Oligocene strata in the Aquitaine Basin

Description
The minute shell has a blunt protoconch. The second whorl shows a peripheral keel. The seven subsequent whorls are moderately rounded, axially and spirally sculptured. The siphonal canal is almost obsolete.

Species
Species within the genus Ceritoturris include:
 Ceritoturris bittium (Dall, 1924)
 † Ceritoturris fecunda Lozouet, 1999 
 † Ceritoturris littoralis Lozouet, 2017
 Ceritoturris nataliae Kilburn, 1988
 † Ceritoturris philippei Lozouet, 2017
 Ceritoturris pupiformis (E. A. Smith, 1884)
 Ceritoturris suavis (Hervier, 1896)
 Ceritoturris thailandica Robba et al., 2006
Species brought into synonymy
 Ceritoturris papillosa (Garrett, 1873): synonym of Carinapex papillosa (Garrett, 1873)
 Ceritoturris theoteles (Melvill & Standen, 1896): synonym of Iredalea theoteles (Melvill & Standen, 1896)

References

 Kilburn R.N. (1988). Turridae (Mollusca: Gastropoda) of southern Africa and Mozambique. Part 4. Subfamilies Drillinae, Crassispirinae and Strictispirinae. Annals of the Natal Museum. 29(1): 167-320.
 Lozouet, P., 1999. Nouvelles espèces de gastéropodes (Mollusca: Gastropoda) de l'Oligocène et du Miocène inférieur d'Aquitaine (sud-ouest de la France). Partie 2. Cossmanniana 6(1-2): 1-68

External links
 Dall W.H. (1924). Notes on molluscan nomenclature. Proceedings of the Biological Society of Washington. 37: 87-90
 Bouchet, P.; Kantor, Y. I.; Sysoev, A.; Puillandre, N. (2011). A new operational classification of the Conoidea (Gastropoda). Journal of Molluscan Studies. 77(3): 273-308

 
Horaiclavidae
Gastropod genera